Buddleja brachystachya is a small shrub endemic to the Yunnan, Sichuan and Gansu provinces of China, where it grows on open, rocky, often dry, places at altitudes of 2,000–2,400 m. It was first described and named by Diels in 1912.

Description
Buddleja brachystachya grows to 0.3–0.9 m in height, with subquadrangular to subterete, densely stellate - tomentose branchlets. The small, opposite leaves have elliptic blades, 1–3.5 cm long by 0.5–1.7 cm wide, acute or obtuse at the apex, cuneate or decurrent at the base, the margins entire. The lavender inflorescences are small, thyrsoid, and often few-flowered, 1.5–3 cm long by 1.5–2.5 cm wide, the corollas 11–18 mm long. Ploidy 2n = 38 (diploid).

Cultivation
The species is uncommon in cultivation. Hardiness: USDA zone 10.

References

Li, P. T. & Leeuwenberg, A. J. M. (1996). Loganiaceae, in Wu, Z. & Raven, P. (eds) Flora of China, Vol. 15. Science Press, Beijing, and Missouri Botanical Garden Press, St. Louis, USA.  online at www.efloras.org

brachystachya
Flora of China